The Battle of Wattrelos at the Flemish (now French) town of Wattrelos on 27 December 1566 between a Calvinist rebel army (sometimes described as "Geuzen") and troops of the Habsburg Netherlands government. It is sometimes considered as one of the first battles of the Eighty Years' War.

Battle 
The rebel army was composed of about 200 men from the sayetterie centre of Hondschoote and its surroundings in West Flanders. They were Calvinists, and their goal was to intervene in the Siege of Valenciennes, where their fellow Calvinists were beleaguered by governmental troops under Philip of Noircarmes.

Maximilian Vilain, baron of Rassenghien and since 1 June 1566 stadtholder of Walloon Flanders, learned that the rebels had arrived at Wattrelos, about fifteen kilometres northeast of Lille. He sent 50 light cavalry and 150 infantry in response. On 27 December, these governmental forces surprised the rebels. The rebels fled into a parish church, which Rassenghien's forces set on fire, so that many rebels burnt to death.

Two days later, on 29 December 1566, Noircarmes defeated another rebel force in the Battle of Lannoy, also north of Lille. In the night of 1 to 2 January 1567, Noircarmes' troops occupied Tournai and expelled the Calvinists there.

References

Bibliography 
 
 
 

1566
History of Flanders
Wattrelos
Battles in Hauts-de-France